Otto Graf (From 1890, Fürst) zu Stolberg-Wernigerode (30 October 1837 – 19 November 1896) was an Imperial German officer, diplomat and politician who served as the first vice-chancellor of the German Empire under Otto Von Bismarck between 1878 and 1881.

Life
He was born at Gedern Castle, Hesse, the third and last child of Count Hermann zu Stolberg-Wernigerode (1802–1841, himself a son of Henry of Stolberg-Wernigerode) and his wife Countess Emma zu Erbach-Fürstenau (great-granddaughter of George Albert III, Count of Erbach-Fürstenau). The ancient noble House of Stolberg had been quasi-sovereign rulers of their County of Stolberg-Wernigerode until the German Mediatisation, when they came under the jurisdiction of Prussia in 1815. His elder brother Albert (Albrecht) died, when he was four years old, his father died shortly afterwards from grief over the loss.

Having been schooled in Duisburg, he read law and administration science at the universities of Göttingen and Heidelberg. Between 1859 and 1861, he served as a cavalry officer in the Gardes du Corps regiment of the Prussian Army. Stolberg had his Wernigerode Castle residence rebuilt in a lavish Gründerzeit style. In 1867 he was appointed First President (Oberpräsident) of the Prussian Province of Hanover at the instigation of Minister-president Otto von Bismarck.

Stolberg endeavoured to integrate the annexed province into the Prussian state. Having served in the North German Reichstag from 1867 to 1871, he became a member of the Free Conservative Party and thereafter had a seat in both the German Reichstag and the Prussian House of Lords (as its president from 1872). In March 1876 he became German ambassador in Austria-Hungary, again on Bismarck's proposal.

In 1878, he was appointed German Vice-Chancellor under Chancellor Bismarck. Stolberg was instrumental in the development of the Dual Alliance with Austria which was concluded in Autumn 1879. He also supported Bismarck's Anti-Socialist Laws, however, over time had more and more differences with the Chancellor and finally resigned from office in 1881. Stolberg remained an active politician, serving as Prussian treasurer and Minister of the Royal House. In 1890 he was granted the hereditary title of Prince (Fürst in German) by Emperor Wilhelm II.

Stolberg died at Wernigerode Castle, aged 59.

Marriage and issue 
On 22 August 1863 at Staniszów Castle, he married Anna Reuss of Köstritz (1837–1907). They had the following children:
 Christian Ernest (1864–1940), Prince of Stolberg-Wernigerode
 married in 1891 Countess Marie of  Castell-Rüdenhausen (1864-1942)
 Elizabeth (1866–1928)
 married in 1885 Count Constantin of Stolberg-Wernigerode (1843-1905)
 Hermann (1867–1913)
 married in 1910 princess Dorothea of Solms-Hohensolms-Lich (1883-1942), daughter of Hermann of Solms-Hohensolms-Lich
 William (1870–1932)
 married in 1910 Princess Elizabeth of Erbach-Schönberg (1883-1966)
 Henry (1871–1874)
 Marie (1872–1950)
 married in 1902 Count William of Solms-Laubach (1861-1936)
 Emma (1875–1956)
 married in 1894 Prince Charles of Solms-Hohensolms-Lich (1866-1920)

Honours and awards

References 

 
 Konrad Breitenborn: Graf Otto zu Stolberg-Wernigerode. Deutscher Standesherr und Politiker der Bismarckzeit. Ausgewählte Dokumente. Jüttners Buchhandlung, Wernigerode 1993, 
 Konrad Breitenborn (Hrsg.): Die Lebenserinnerungen des Fürsten Otto zu Stolberg-Wernigerode (1837–1896). Jüttners Buchhandlung, Wernigerode 1996, 

1837 births
1896 deaths
People from Gedern
People from the Grand Duchy of Hesse
Otto
Otto
German Protestants
Free Conservative Party politicians
Vice-Chancellors of Germany
Members of the 1st Reichstag of the German Empire
Members of the 2nd Reichstag of the German Empire
Members of the 3rd Reichstag of the German Empire
Members of the Prussian House of Lords
Members of the First Chamber of the Estates of the Grand Duchy of Hesse
Ambassadors of Germany to Austria
Recipients of the Iron Cross (1870), 2nd class
Grand Crosses of the Order of Saint Stephen of Hungary
Recipients of the Order of the Netherlands Lion
Grand Crosses of the Order of the Star of Romania
Military personnel from Hesse
German landowners